Cham Mehr or Cham-e Mehr may refer to:

Cham Mehr-e Bala
Cham Mehr-e Pain